Charles Bannister (1879 – August 1952) was an English footballer who played in the Football League for Manchester City and Lincoln City and in the Southern League for Swindon Town and Reading. A centre half, he was born in Burton upon Trent, Staffordshire, and emigrated to Australia after his retirement from professional football.

References

1879 births
Sportspeople from Burton upon Trent
1952 deaths
English footballers
Association football defenders
Newtown A.F.C. players
Manchester City F.C. players
Oldham County F.C. players
Lincoln City F.C. players
Swindon Town F.C. players
Reading F.C. players
English Football League players
Southern Football League players